The Saint Blaise Chapel is an historic ruin located in the hamlet of Saint-Triphon in Switzerland. This romanesque style chapel, which existed still at least 1174, was partially restored in 2009.

References

Tourist attractions in the canton of Vaud